Yellow Lake is a lake in Berrien County, in the U.S. state of Michigan.

Yellow Lake was so named on account of the yellowish tint of the water.

References

Lakes of Berrien County, Michigan